Isakovo is the name of several rural localities in Russia.

Modern localities

Arkhangelsk Oblast
As of 2014, two rural localities in Arkhangelsk Oblast bear this name:
Isakovo, Kargopolsky District, Arkhangelsk Oblast, a village in Krechetovsky Selsoviet of Kargopolsky District
Isakovo, Krasnoborsky District, Arkhangelsk Oblast, a village in Verkhneuftyugsky Selsoviet of Krasnoborsky District

Chuvash Republic
As of 2010, one rural locality in the Chuvash Republic bears this name:
Isakovo, Chuvash Republic, a selo in Isakovskoye Rural Settlement of Krasnoarmeysky District

Ivanovo Oblast
As of 2010, four rural localities in Ivanovo Oblast bear this name:
Isakovo, Komsomolsky District, Ivanovo Oblast, a village in Komsomolsky District
Isakovo, Savinsky District, Ivanovo Oblast, a village in Savinsky District
Isakovo, Shuysky District, Ivanovo Oblast, a village in Shuysky District
Isakovo, Verkhnelandekhovsky District, Ivanovo Oblast, a village in Verkhnelandekhovsky District

Kaluga Oblast
As of 2010, three rural localities in Kaluga Oblast bear this name:
Isakovo, Medynsky District, Kaluga Oblast, a village in Medynsky District
Isakovo (Lopatino Rural Settlement), Tarussky District, Kaluga Oblast, a village in Tarussky District; municipally, a part of Lopatino Rural Settlement of that district
Isakovo (Voznesenye Rural Settlement), Tarussky District, Kaluga Oblast, a village in Tarussky District; municipally, a part of Voznesenye Rural Settlement of that district

Kirov Oblast
As of 2010, two rural localities in Kirov Oblast bear this name:
Isakovo, Malmyzhsky District, Kirov Oblast, a village in Adzhimsky Rural Okrug of Malmyzhsky District
Isakovo, Sanchursky District, Kirov Oblast, a village in Gorodishchensky Rural Okrug of Sanchursky District

Kostroma Oblast
As of 2010, three rural localities in Kostroma Oblast bear this name:
Isakovo, Antropovsky District, Kostroma Oblast, a village in Palkinskoye Settlement of Antropovsky District
Isakovo, Makaryevsky District, Kostroma Oblast, a village in Nizhne-Neyskoye Settlement of Makaryevsky District
Isakovo, Vokhomsky District, Kostroma Oblast, a village in Belkovskoye Settlement of Vokhomsky District

Kurgan Oblast
As of 2010, one rural locality in Kurgan Oblast bears this name:
Isakovo, Kurgan Oblast, a village in Racheyevsky Selsoviet of Tselinny District

Kursk Oblast
As of 2010, two rural localities in Kursk Oblast bear this name:
Isakovo, Isakovsky Selsoviet, Cheremisinovsky District, Kursk Oblast, a selo in Isakovsky Selsoviet of Cheremisinovsky District
Isakovo, Starosavinsky Selsoviet, Cheremisinovsky District, Kursk Oblast, a village in Starosavinsky Selsoviet of Cheremisinovsky District

Leningrad Oblast
As of 2010, three rural localities in Leningrad Oblast bear this name:
Isakovo, Luzhsky District, Leningrad Oblast, a village in Osminskoye Settlement Municipal Formation of Luzhsky District
Isakovo, Gankovskoye Settlement Municipal Formation, Tikhvinsky District, Leningrad Oblast, a village in Gankovskoye Settlement Municipal Formation of Tikhvinsky District
Isakovo, Koskovskoye Settlement Municipal Formation, Tikhvinsky District, Leningrad Oblast, a village in Koskovskoye Settlement Municipal Formation of Tikhvinsky District

Moscow Oblast
As of 2010, ten rural localities in Moscow Oblast bear this name:
Isakovo, Kostinskoye Rural Settlement, Dmitrovsky District, Moscow Oblast, a village in Kostinskoye Rural Settlement of Dmitrovsky District
Isakovo, Kulikovskoye Rural Settlement, Dmitrovsky District, Moscow Oblast, a village in Kulikovskoye Rural Settlement of Dmitrovsky District
Isakovo, Istrinsky District, Moscow Oblast, a village in Pavlo-Slobodskoye Rural Settlement of Istrinsky District
Isakovo, Klinsky District, Moscow Oblast, a village in Voroninskoye Rural Settlement of Klinsky District
Isakovo, Noginsky District, Moscow Oblast, a village under the administrative jurisdiction of   the town of  Elektrougli, Noginsky District
Isakovo, Podolsky District, Moscow Oblast, a village in Mikhaylovo-Yartsevskoye Rural Settlement of Podolsky District
Isakovo, Lunevskoye Rural Settlement, Solnechnogorsky District, Moscow Oblast, a village in Lunevskoye Rural Settlement of Solnechnogorsky District
Isakovo, Sokolovskoye Rural Settlement, Solnechnogorsky District, Moscow Oblast, a village in Sokolovskoye Rural Settlement of Solnechnogorsky District
Isakovo, Volokolamsky District, Moscow Oblast, a village in Yaropoletskoye Rural Settlement of Volokolamsky District
Isakovo, Voskresensky District, Moscow Oblast, a village in Ashitkovskoye Rural Settlement of Voskresensky District

Nizhny Novgorod Oblast
As of 2010, one rural locality in Nizhny Novgorod Oblast bears this name:
Isakovo, Nizhny Novgorod Oblast, a village in Loyminsky Selsoviet of Sokolsky District

Novgorod Oblast
As of 2010, one rural locality in Novgorod Oblast bears this name:
Isakovo, Novgorod Oblast, a village in Pesotskoye Settlement of Demyansky District

Perm Krai
As of 2010, one rural locality in Perm Krai bears this name:
Isakovo, Perm Krai, a village in Cherdynsky District

Pskov Oblast
As of 2010, nine rural localities in Pskov Oblast bear this name:
Isakovo, Bezhanitsky District, Pskov Oblast, a village in Bezhanitsky District
Isakovo (Miritinitskaya Rural Settlement), Loknyansky District, Pskov Oblast, a village in Loknyansky District; municipally, a part of Miritinitskaya Rural Settlement of that district
Isakovo (Loknyanskaya Rural Settlement), Loknyansky District, Pskov Oblast, a village in Loknyansky District; municipally, a part of Loknyanskaya Rural Settlement of that district
Isakovo, Nevelsky District, Pskov Oblast, a village in Nevelsky District
Isakovo (Zhadritskaya Rural Settlement), Novorzhevsky District, Pskov Oblast, a village in Novorzhevsky District; municipally, a part of Zhadritskaya Rural Settlement of that district
Isakovo (Vyborskaya Rural Settlement), Novorzhevsky District, Pskov Oblast, a village in Novorzhevsky District; municipally, a part of Vyborskaya Rural Settlement of that district
Isakovo, Novosokolnichesky District, Pskov Oblast, a village in Novosokolnichesky District
Isakovo, Porkhovsky District, Pskov Oblast, a village in Porkhovsky District
Isakovo, Sebezhsky District, Pskov Oblast, a village in Sebezhsky District

Samara Oblast
As of 2010, one rural locality in Samara Oblast bears this name:
Isakovo, Samara Oblast, a selo in Pokhvistnevsky District

Smolensk Oblast
As of 2010, seven rural localities in Smolensk Oblast bear this name:
Isakovo, Demidovsky District, Smolensk Oblast, a village under the administrative jurisdiction of   Demidovskoye Urban Settlement of Demidovsky District
Isakovo, Kholm-Zhirkovsky District, Smolensk Oblast, a village in Tomskoye Rural Settlement of Kholm-Zhirkovsky District
Isakovo, Korokhotkinskoye Rural Settlement, Smolensky District, Smolensk Oblast, a village in Korokhotkinskoye Rural Settlement of Smolensky District
Isakovo, Loinskoye Rural Settlement, Smolensky District, Smolensk Oblast, a village in Loinskoye Rural Settlement of Smolensky District
Isakovo, Smetaninskoye Rural Settlement, Smolensky District, Smolensk Oblast, a village in Smetaninskoye Rural Settlement of Smolensky District
Isakovo, Vyazemsky District, Smolensk Oblast, a selo in Isakovskoye Rural Settlement of Vyazemsky District
Isakovo, Yartsevsky District, Smolensk Oblast, a village in Lvovskoye Rural Settlement of Yartsevsky District

Republic of Tatarstan
As of 2010, two rural localities in the Republic of Tatarstan bear this name:
Isakovo, Buinsky District, Republic of Tatarstan, a selo in Buinsky District
Isakovo, Zelenodolsky District, Republic of Tatarstan, a village in Zelenodolsky District

Tula Oblast
As of 2010, two rural localities in Tula Oblast bear this name:
Isakovo, Suvorovsky District, Tula Oblast, a village in Bogdanovskaya Rural Territory of Suvorovsky District
Isakovo, Venyovsky District, Tula Oblast, a selo in Tulubyevsky Rural Okrug of Venyovsky District

Tver Oblast
As of 2010, four rural localities in Tver Oblast bear this name:
Isakovo, Kalyazinsky District, Tver Oblast, a village in Kalyazinsky District
Isakovo, Torzhoksky District, Tver Oblast, a village in Torzhoksky District
Isakovo, Zapadnodvinsky District, Tver Oblast, a village in Zapadnodvinsky District
Isakovo, Zubtsovsky District, Tver Oblast, a village in Zubtsovsky District

Udmurt Republic
As of 2010, one rural locality in the Udmurt Republic bears this name:
Isakovo, Udmurt Republic, a village in Isakovsky Selsoviet of Balezinsky District

Vladimir Oblast
As of 2010, three rural localities in Vladimir Oblast bear this name:
Isakovo, Selivanovsky District, Vladimir Oblast, a village in Selivanovsky District
Isakovo, Sudogodsky District, Vladimir Oblast, a village in Sudogodsky District
Isakovo, Yuryev-Polsky District, Vladimir Oblast, a selo in Yuryev-Polsky District

Vologda Oblast
As of 2010, seventeen rural localities in Vologda Oblast bear this name:
Isakovo, Babushkinsky District, Vologda Oblast, a village in Podbolotny Selsoviet of Babushkinsky District
Isakovo, Gryazovetsky District, Vologda Oblast, a village in Minkinsky Selsoviet of Gryazovetsky District
Isakovo, Charozersky Selsoviet, Kirillovsky District, Vologda Oblast, a village in Charozersky Selsoviet of Kirillovsky District
Isakovo, Kovarzinsky Selsoviet, Kirillovsky District, Vologda Oblast, a village in Kovarzinsky Selsoviet of Kirillovsky District
Isakovo, Arkhangelsky Selsoviet, Sokolsky District, Vologda Oblast, a village in Arkhangelsky Selsoviet of Sokolsky District
Isakovo, Pelshemsky Selsoviet, Sokolsky District, Vologda Oblast, a village in Pelshemsky Selsoviet of Sokolsky District
Isakovo, Totemsky District, Vologda Oblast, a village in Matveyevsky Selsoviet of Totemsky District
Isakovo, Ustyansky Selsoviet, Ust-Kubinsky District, Vologda Oblast, a village in Ustyansky Selsoviet of Ust-Kubinsky District
Isakovo, Zadneselsky Selsoviet, Ust-Kubinsky District, Vologda Oblast, a village in Zadneselsky Selsoviet of Ust-Kubinsky District
Isakovo, Ustyuzhensky District, Vologda Oblast, a village in Ustyuzhensky Selsoviet of Ustyuzhensky District
Isakovo, Vashkinsky District, Vologda Oblast, a village in Piksimovsky Selsoviet of Vashkinsky District
Isakovo, Velikoustyugsky District, Vologda Oblast, a village in Nizhneshardengsky Selsoviet of Velikoustyugsky District
Isakovo, Bereznikovsky Selsoviet, Vologodsky District, Vologda Oblast, a village in Bereznikovsky Selsoviet of Vologodsky District
Isakovo, Kipelovsky Selsoviet, Vologodsky District, Vologda Oblast, a village in Kipelovsky Selsoviet of Vologodsky District
Isakovo, Sosnovsky Selsoviet, Vologodsky District, Vologda Oblast, a village in Sosnovsky Selsoviet of Vologodsky District
Isakovo, Veprevsky Selsoviet, Vologodsky District, Vologda Oblast, a village in Veprevsky Selsoviet of Vologodsky District
Isakovo, Vozhegodsky District, Vologda Oblast, a village in Mishutinsky Selsoviet of Vozhegodsky District

Yaroslavl Oblast
As of 2010, eight rural localities in Yaroslavl Oblast bear this name:
Isakovo, Gavrilov-Yamsky District, Yaroslavl Oblast, a village in Stoginsky Rural Okrug of Gavrilov-Yamsky District
Isakovo, Myshkinsky District, Yaroslavl Oblast, a village in Bogorodsky Rural Okrug of Myshkinsky District
Isakovo, Pervomaysky District, Yaroslavl Oblast, a village in Krutovsky Rural Okrug of Pervomaysky District
Isakovo, Poshekhonsky District, Yaroslavl Oblast, a village in Sverdlovsky Rural Okrug of Poshekhonsky District
Isakovo, Rostovsky District, Yaroslavl Oblast, a village in Moseytsevsky Rural Okrug of Rostovsky District
Isakovo, Tutayevsky District, Yaroslavl Oblast, a village in Rodionovsky Rural Okrug of Tutayevsky District
Isakovo, Lyutovsky Rural Okrug, Yaroslavsky District, Yaroslavl Oblast, a village in Lyutovsky Rural Okrug of Yaroslavsky District
Isakovo, Tunoshensky Rural Okrug, Yaroslavsky District, Yaroslavl Oblast, a village in Tunoshensky Rural Okrug of Yaroslavsky District

Abolished localities
Isakovo, Solovetsky District, Arkhangelsk Oblast, a settlement in Solovetsky District of Arkhangelsk Oblast abolished in June 2014